The Haddon Township School District is a comprehensive community public school district that serves students in pre-kindergarten through twelfth grade from Haddon Township, in Camden County, New Jersey, United States.

As of the 2018–19 school year, the district, comprised of seven schools, had an enrollment of 2,060 students and 165.9 classroom teachers (on an FTE basis), for a student–teacher ratio of 12.4:1.

The district is classified by the New Jersey Department of Education as being in District Factor Group "FG", the fourth-highest of eight groupings. District Factor Groups organize districts statewide to allow comparison by common socioeconomic characteristics of the local districts. From lowest socioeconomic status to highest, the categories are A, B, CD, DE, FG, GH, I and J.

A lobbying effort by students at Strawbridge Elementary school led John A. Rocco and Thomas J. Shusted to introduce a bill to name the hadrosaurus foulkii as the official state dinosaur; the legislation was signed into law by Governor James Florio with students from the school in attendance at the signing ceremony.

Schools
Schools in the district (with 2018–19 enrollment data from the National Center for Education Statistics) are:
Elementary schools
Thomas A. Edison Elementary School (152 students; in grades PreK-5), Anthony Fitzpatrick, Principal
Clyde S. Jennings Elementary School (113; K-5), Charles A. Warfield, Principal
Stoy Elementary School (168; PreK-5), Charles Warfield, Principal
Strawbridge Elementary School (196; K-5), Anthony Fitzpatrick, Principal
Van Sciver Elementary School (319; PreK-5), Don Pullano, Principal
Middle school
William G. Rohrer Middle School (465; 6-8), Patricia A. Schwab, Principal
High school
Haddon Township High School (622; 9-12), Gary O'Brien, Principal

Administration
Dr. Robert J. Fisicaro is the Superintendent. Jennifer Gauld is the Business Administrator / Board Secretary

Board of education
The district's board of education, comprised of nine members, sets policy and oversees the fiscal and educational operation of the district through its administration. As a Type II school district, the board's trustees are elected directly by voters to serve three-year terms of office on a staggered basis, with three seats up for election each year held (since 2012) as part of the November general election. The board appoints a superintendent to oversee the day-to-day operation of the district.

References

External links
Haddon Township School District
 
School Data for the Haddon Township School District, National Center for Education Statistics

Haddon Township, New Jersey
New Jersey District Factor Group FG
School districts in Camden County, New Jersey